Ernst Baylon (born 21 October 1903, date of death unknown) was an Austrian fencer. He competed in the team foil event at the 1928 and 1936 Summer Olympics.

References

External links
 

1903 births
Year of death missing
Austrian male fencers
Olympic fencers of Austria
Fencers at the 1928 Summer Olympics
Fencers at the 1936 Summer Olympics